Roger A. Madigan (February 25, 1930 – June 2, 2018) was an American politician from Pennsylvania who served as a Republican member of the Pennsylvania House of Representatives for the 110th district from 1976 to 1984 and the Pennsylvania State Senate for the 23rd District from 1985 to 2009.

Early life and education
Madigan was born in Luthers Mills, Pennsylvania to Albert E. and Ada Madigan.  He graduated from Troy High School and received a B.S. degree in dairy production from Pennsylvania State University in 1951.

He worked as a dairy farmer from 1951 to 1964 and as an insurance underwriter from 1964 to 1977.

Career
Madigan served as a member of the Pennsylvania House of Representatives for the 110th district from 1976 to 1984 and the Pennsylvania State Senate for the 23rd District from 1985 to 2009.

He served as a member of the Penn State Board of Trustees for agricultural studies from 1979 to 2001 and the Pennsylvania College of Technology board of directors from 1991 to 2008.

He died on June 2, 2018 in Harrisburg, Pennsylvania and was interred at Bradford County Memorial Park in Towanda, Pennsylvania.

Legacy
The Roger and Peggy Madigan Library at Pennsylvania College of Technology was partly named in his honor.

References

External links
Pennsylvania Senate – Roger A. Madigan official PA Senate website (archived)
 official Party website (archived)
Biography, voting record, and interest group ratings at Project Vote Smart

|-

1930 births
2018 deaths
20th-century American politicians
21st-century American politicians
Burials in Pennsylvania
Businesspeople from Pennsylvania
Dairy farmers
Farmers from Pennsylvania
Members of the Pennsylvania House of Representatives
Penn State College of Agricultural Sciences alumni
Pennsylvania state senators
People from Towanda, Pennsylvania
20th-century American businesspeople